"Wake Up" is a song by Belgian singer Eliot Vassamillet. The song represented Belgium in the Eurovision Song Contest 2019 in Tel Aviv, where it was performed during the first semi-final but did not qualify for the final. The song was released on 28 February 2019.

Eurovision Song Contest

The song was selected to represent Belgium in the Eurovision Song Contest 2019 after Eliot Vassamillet was internally selected by the Belgian broadcaster. On 28 January 2019, a special allocation draw was held which placed each country into one of the two semi-finals, as well as which half of the show they would perform in. Belgium was placed into the first semi-final, to be held on 14 May 2019, and was scheduled to perform in the second half of the show. Once all the competing songs for the 2019 contest had been released, the running order for the semi-finals was decided by the show's producers rather than through another draw, so that similar songs were not placed next to each other. Belgium performed in position 10. However, the song failed to qualify for the grand final.

Charts

References

English-language Belgian songs
2019 songs
2019 singles
Eurovision songs of 2019
Eurovision songs of Belgium
Songs written by Pierre Dumoulin (songwriter)